Ryan Public Schools is a school district headquartered in the Ryan School Administration Building in Ryan, Oklahoma. It contains an elementary school and a combined middle/high school. 

 Mancus Chapman is the superintendent and the elementary school principal while Tony Tomberlin is the high school principal.

References

External links
 Ryan Public Schools
Jefferson County, Oklahoma
School districts in Oklahoma